Hillsborough County Public Schools (HCPS) is a school district that runs the public school system of Hillsborough County in west central Florida and is headquartered in Tampa, Florida. It is frequently referred to as the School District of Hillsborough County (SDHC).

The district serves all of Hillsborough County. It is the third largest school district in Florida and the 8th largest in the United States. It is governed by the School Board of Hillsborough County, which consists of seven elected members and one superintendent, who is hired by the board. The current superintendent is Addison Davis.

History

In 2021 it had over 213,000 students, giving it the seventh highest student population of any U.S. school district.

During the COVID-19 pandemic in Florida, one week after the start of school in 2021 the district had 1,805 cases where students and/or employees contracted COVID-19, and as a result had to isolate or quarantine about 338 employees and 10,384 pupils.

List of Schools

Demographics
In the 2021–2022 academic year, the ethnic makeup of Hillsborough County Public Schools was as follows:
https://www.hillsboroughschools.org/cms/lib/FL50000635/Centricity/Domain/4/DemographicReport.pdf

4.52% Asian
21.06% Black
36.87% Hispanic
0.18% Indian
6.27% Multi
31.10% White

School Board 

The Hillsborough County School Board consists of seven elected officials, five elected by voters in their district and two elected on a countywide basis.  As of November 17, 2020 the board consists of: 
 Lynn Gray-District 7
 Stacy Hahn-District 2
 Nadia Combs-District 1 (chair)
 Jessica Vaughn-District 3
 Melissa Snively-District 4
 Henry "Shake" Washington-District 5 (Vice Chair)
 Karen Perez-District 6

The board has the authority to hire and fire the superintendent, who oversees the day-to-day operation of the school system and reports to the board. Since March 2020, the superintendent has been Addison Davis, who was previously the superintendent of schools in Clay County in northern Florida.

School Libraries 
Each school in the county has a Library/Media Center and a full-time, certified Media Specialist. The Media Specialist is responsible for creating and curating the school’s collection of online and physical books, periodicals, audio/visual materials, and maker space materials. Each school’s collection is their own and should reflect the community around the school and the needs of the students and teachers at that site. Every library has a public-facing catalogue that allows the public to review all books in the library pursuant to Fl Senate Bill CS/HB 1467.

The school libraries have three main programs each year: Poetry Jam at the Middle and High School Level, SLAM, Student Literacy & Media, Showcase for all levels, and the Storytelling Festival for Elementary levels. 

Poetry Jam is a coordination between the Hillsborough County Public Schools Library Media Services and the Arts in Education Department. Local Poets come to school libraries to host writing workshops with students who then participate in a school level Jam competition. At the high school level, the top three students get to advance to a district competition.

SLAM Showcase is a celebration of reading based around the SSRYA Jr, Sunshine State Young Readers Award Junior, SSYRA, Sunshine State Young Readers Award, and Florida Teen Reads selected works each year. Students interested in participating read one of the works for their age level and then create art based on the book, either 2D, 3D, or digital art. Each school then selects students from each category to attend a festival at the Tampa Convention Center where all the art is displayed and several authors of the works participate in a panel discussion with time for student questions and then book signings.

The Storytelling Festival is put on by the Tampa-Hillsborough County Public Library and Hillsborough County Public School Libraries participates each year by bringing storytellers into elementary schools to host workshops for students. Students may then choose to sign up to participate in the storytelling festival and tell their own memorized piece.

Athletics 
Hillsborough County Schools provides athletic opportunities for high school boys in baseball, basketball, cross country, football, golf, soccer, swimming, tennis, track and field, wrestling, and lacrosse.  For high school girls, the sports are basketball, cheer, cross country, flag football, golf, soccer, softball, swimming, tennis, track and field, lacrosse, and volleyball.

Strawberry Schools
Prior to 1956, many of the schools in the county in the eastern section near Plant City maintained an unusual schedule based on the strawberry growing city. These schools were closed from January through March and were referred to as Strawberry Schools. Among these schools were the Glover School, Cork, Keysville, Pinecrest, and Turkey Creek. Some schools in this area of the county retain one vestige of the old schedule; rather than having a spring holiday for the Florida State Fair, they celebrate a holiday for the Florida Strawberry Festival.

Integration
Like most public school systems in the southern United States, Hillsborough County once maintained a strictly racially segregated school system. Several schools had a population of 100 percent minority students, including Don Thompson Vocational High School in Tampa, (now known as Blake High School) and the Glover School in Bealsville, Florida near Plant City, while most public schools were for white students only. Following the U.S. Supreme Court's Brown v. Board of Education decision of 1954, a federal district court found in 1962 that Hillsborough County was operating an "illegally segregated public school system". The district spent much of the next 9 years employing various strategies designed to delay integration of the schools. Hillsborough County began integrating select schools during the 1965–1966 school year, but in 1971, a federal judge ruled that the pace was too slow and ordered the school district to initiate a comprehensive desegregation program. The school system responded with a busing program designed to result in the same percentage of students by race in each school. The program put almost all of the burden of busing on the black community. Historically black schools, such as Blake and Middleton, were "demoted" to junior high school status and students and teachers, including many who had been there for decades, were reassigned to white suburban schools. Black students faced busing for 10 out of 12 years, while for whites they were only bused 2 of 12 years. While a relatively small number of white flight schools were founded in this time period, three of the five schools hosted grades six and seven only (the grades in which white students were bused.) Immediately following integration the incidents of school discipline grew rapidly, with half of the students disciplined being black, despite making up only one fifth the student population. After continued complaints by activists, the disciplinary situation began to be more equitable after 1974.

In 1991, the district received court approval for a cluster plan to lessen disruption to students. As part of this plan, the district created magnet schools to attract white students to historically black schools, and single-grade schools were replaced with groupings of ages, such as middle schools. In 1994, the NAACP sued the district, alleging that the schools were being resegregated, with some schools being as much as 90% black. A 1998 court ruling agreed that Hillsborough County's school's were not yet "desegregated to the maximum extent practicable" and continued federal monitoring of the process. For the 2001–2002 school year, the district replaced its busing program with a new school choice in an attempt to reduce re-segregation. In 2001, a federal court of appeals declared that the district's schools were "unitary", meaning that they were sufficiently integrated and federal monitoring was no longer required.

Security

The school district utilizes Hillsborough County Public Schools Security Services and the Hillsborough County Sheriffs Office at many schools around the county. Known as School Resource Officers, they provide armed security along with other services where they are assigned. Other jurisdictions assist with service calls in a backup capacity. These agencies include Plant City Police Department, Temple Terrace Police Department, and Tampa Police Department. During some local school sponsored sporting events the district will utilize the Florida Highway Patrol, USF Police Department, and Tampa Airport Police Department in conjunction with the other agencies to provide security. Since the school sponsored events are generally served by off-duty law enforcement officers, other local agencies may also be present.

Gates Foundation grant 

In 2009, the Hillsborough County School District was awarded a $100-million-dollar grant by the Bill and Melinda Gates Foundation to improve education through improved mentoring and evaluation of teachers. For six years, the grant funded the "Empowering Effective Teachers" plan.

Empowering Effective Teachers 

Empowering Effective Teachers was an initiative to promote improvements in education in the school district by increasing effective teaching through new teacher assessments, salary scales, teacher training programs and recruitment. The early phases of the initiative rolled out in 2010, when the district's teacher evaluation form was radically redeveloped into a complex rubric with four areas of focus and multiple subpoints within each area.

The new evaluation standard caused an uproar in the district, mainly due to how classroom evaluations have been implemented since the plan's roll out. Across the state of Florida, 40 percent of a teacher's final evaluation score now is determined by calculating students’ learning growth from one year to the next, and a similar policy has been implemented across other states.
 
In response to the increased demands placed on teachers by the new evaluation system, teachers who opted into the new system would receive a pay increase. The initial increase for most was at least a few thousand dollars, with those earning evaluation scores of 4 or 5 receiving an additional $2,000 or $3,000 each year, respectively. The new pay scale was released at the end of 2013, and all teachers hired before 2011 had a few months to evaluate the new pay scale for deciding if they would opt in. Teachers who did not opt in were not exempt from the new evaluation system; however, their pay would not be affected by their final evaluation score.

References

External links

 
 List of all Hillsborough County Schools by Area

Schools in Hillsborough County, Florida
School districts in Florida
Education in Hillsborough County, Florida
Educational institutions established in 2010
2010 establishments in Florida